The Ricoh WG-4 is a digital compact camera announced by Ricoh on February 5, 2014, successor to the Pentax WG-3. It is advertised as water-proof to 14m, shock-proof to drops from up to a 2m height, crush-proof to 220 pounds of force and freeze-proof to -10 degrees Celsius.

Notes and references

http://www.dpreview.com/products/ricoh/compacts/ricoh_wg4/specifications

WG-04
Cameras introduced in 2014